The Russian Orthodox Church in Finland is a semi-autonomous part of the Russian Orthodox Church formed in 1926. An official headquarters of the Moscow Patriarchate, led by Father Viktor Lyutik, was opened in Helsinki in 1999.

The Russian Orthodox Church in Finland is organized in two parishes, St. Nikolaos Orthodox Parish in Helsinki and the Intercession Orthodox Parish. They are maintaining six churches in Helsinki, Turku, Pori and Sastamala. Total number of registered members is some 3,000, most of them hold Finnish citizenship. The largest community is the St. Nikolaos Orthodox Parish with more than 2,400 members. The Spaso-Preobrazenskaja community in Tampere is under the jurisdiction of the Russian Orthodox Church Outside Russia.

History 
The Finnish Orthodox Church disengaged from the Russian Orthodox Church in 1923 as a result of the Russian Revolution of 1917 and the Independence of Finland. Some of the Orthodox in Finland wanted to retain the traditional Russian ways, like the use of Church Slavonic in liturgy and the Julian calendar, so they formed their own congregation. The first parish, Private Orthodox Society, was established in Vyborg. From 1931 to 1945 Russian Orthodox Church in Finland was under the Ecumenical Patriarchate of Constantinople.

Churches 
Church of the Protection of the Theotokos, Munkkiniemi, Helsinki
Saint Nicholas Church, Hietaniemi, Helsinki
Church of Xenia of Saint Petersburg, Mellunmäki, Helsinki
Church of the Dormition, Turku
Church of Our Lady of Kazan, Pori
Church of St. Serafim of Sarov, Sastamala

References

External links 

Eastern Orthodoxy in Finland
Russian Orthodox Church
Eastern Orthodox Church bodies in Europe